Gerardo Seoane Castro (born 30 October 1978) also known as Gerry Seoane, is a Swiss professional football coach and former player, who last managed Bayer Leverkusen.

Managerial career
Seoane was appointed manager of reigning Swiss Super League champions Young Boys on 2 June 2018. Seoane, aged 39, was considered a surprise pick to succeed Adi Hütter as coach, despite guiding FC Luzern to third place in the Super League in his first full management job. Upon taking the role as Young Boys manager, Seoane pledged to continue with Hütter's playing style and keep the backroom staff in place.

In his first season in charge, he guided the club to their 13th league title and helped the club qualify to the group stage of the UEFA Champions League for the first time in club history. In his second season, Seoane led the club to a domestic double, delivering their 14th league title (their third in a row) and seventh cup title and first in over 30 years.

In May 2021, it was announced that Seoane would coach Bundesliga club Bayer Leverkusen. In the 2021–22 season, he led Bayer Leverkusen to finish third in the Bundesliga, to be their best finish in seven seasons. However, he was sacked on 5 October 2022, due to his Leverkusen's poorest season start since their promotion in 1979. Leverkusen had won only one game, drawn two, and lost five games, resulting in only five points in their first eight games.

Personal life
Seoane was born in Luzern, Switzerland to Galician parents and holds both Swiss and Spanish citizenship. In addition to German, he is also fluent in Spanish, English, French, Italian and Portuguese.

Managerial statistics

Honours

Manager
Young Boys
Swiss Super League: 2018–19, 2019–20, 2020–21
Swiss Cup: 2019–20

References

External links

Gerardo Seoane career statistics at The Guardian
Gerardo Seoane managerial statistics at the Swiss Super League 

1978 births
Living people
Sportspeople from Lucerne
Swiss people of Galician descent
Swiss people of Spanish descent
Swiss men's footballers
Swiss football managers
Spanish footballers
Association football defenders
Association football midfielders
Swiss Super League players
FC Luzern players
FC Sion players
AC Bellinzona players
FC Aarau players
Grasshopper Club Zürich players
Deportivo Fabril players
FC Luzern managers
BSC Young Boys managers
Swiss Super League managers
Bayer 04 Leverkusen managers
Bundesliga managers
Swiss expatriate football managers
Expatriate football managers in Germany
Swiss expatriate sportspeople in Germany